Culpeper (formerly Culpeper Courthouse, earlier Fairfax) is an incorporated town in Culpeper County, Virginia, United States. The population was 20,062 at the 2020 census, up from 16,379 at the 2010 census. It is the county seat of Culpeper County.

Geography
According to the U.S. Census Bureau, the town has a total area of 7.31 square miles (18.9 km), of which 7.27 square miles (18.8 km) is land and 0.04 square mile (0.1 km) is water.

History
After establishing Culpeper County, Virginia in 1748, the Virginia House of Burgesses voted to establish the Town of Fairfax on February 22, 1759. The name honored Thomas Fairfax, 6th Lord Fairfax of Cameron
(1693–1781) who was proprietor of the Northern Neck peninsula, a vast domain north of the Rappahannock River; his territory was then defined as stretching from Chesapeake Bay to what is now Hampshire County, West Virginia.

The original plan of the town called for ten blocks, which form the core of Culpeper's downtown area today. The original town was surveyed by a young George Washington, who at age 17 was a protege of the 6th Lord Fairfax. In 1795, the town received a U.S. Post Office under the name Culpeper Court House, although most maps continued to show the Fairfax name. The confusion resulting from the difference in official and postal names, coupled with the existence to the northeast of Fairfax Court House and Fairfax Station post offices in Fairfax County, was finally resolved when the Virginia General Assembly formally renamed the town as simply Culpeper in 1869 (Acts, 1869–1870, chapter 118, page 154).

During the American Revolutionary War (1775-1783), the Culpeper Minutemen, a pro-Independence militia, formed in the town of Culpeper Courthouse. They organized in what was then known as "Clayton's Old Field," near today's Yowell Meadow Park.

During the Civil War (1861-1865), Culpeper was a crossroads for a number of armies marching through central Virginia, with both Union and Confederate forces occupying the town by turn. In the heart of downtown, the childhood home of Confederate General A.P. Hill stands at the corner of Main and Davis streets. One block north on Main Street (present location of Piedmont Realty) was the frame house where "The Gallant Major" John Pelham died after sustaining a wound at the Battle of Kelly's Ford.

In 1974, the town had a Choral Society, an Odd Fellows Hall, and an American Legion Hall.

Culpeper began to grow dramatically in the 1980s, becoming a "bedroom community" of more densely populated Northern Virginia and Washington, D.C. suburbs. A growing number of residents of the town and county of Culpeper once lived and continue to work in those areas.

In 2011, East Davis Street in downtown Culpeper was named as a 2011 America's Great Place by the American Planning Association.

Downtown Culpeper was one of the communities most affected by the August 23, 2011 Virginia earthquake. Several buildings along Main Street and East Davis Street suffered structural damage, and some were later condemned. The earthquake led to the temporary evacuation of the Packard Campus for Audio-Visual Conservation, which at the time was hosting a town hall event for U.S. Senator Mark Warner.

In 2014, the Museum of Culpeper History moved into the town's historic train depot.

Demographics

As of the 2010 census, the racial makeup of the town was 61.5% White, 21.9% Black, 0.6% Native American, 2.1% Asian, 0.01% Pacific Islander, and 4.0% from two or more races. Hispanic or Latino of any race were 17.0% of the population.

The town's population included 25.7% under the age of 18, 10.0% from 18 to 24, 30.3% from 25 to 44, 19.0% from 45 to 64, and 15.0% who were 65 years of age or older. The median age was 35 years. For every 100 females, there were 87.9 males. For every 100 females age 18 and over, there were 82.9 males. The median income for a household in the town was at a time $35,438, and the median income for a family was $41,894 but due to the economic downturn this has changed. Males had a median income of $28,658 versus $25,252 for females. The per capita income for the town was $16,842. About 23.0% of families and 26.9% of the population were below the poverty line, including 40.8% of those under age 18 and 22.1% of those age 65 or over.

Climate
Culpeper has a humid subtropical climate (Köppen Cfa), with very warm, humid summers and cool winters.

Transportation
Highways directly serving Culpeper include U.S. Route 15 Business, U.S. Route 29 Business, U.S. Route 522, Virginia State Route 3 and Virginia State Route 229. U.S. Route 15 and U.S. Route 29 pass just southeast of the town limits. US 15 Bus, US 29 Bus and US 522 share the same alignment through downtown, following Main Street. US 29 extends southwest towards Charlottesville and Interstate 64 westbound, while US 15 provides connections southward towards Orange and Gordonsville. US 15 and US 29 are concurrent to the north, providing connections to Warrenton and Washington, D.C. US 522 connects southward to I-64 eastbound, and northward towards Front Royal, Winchester and Interstate 81. SR 3 extends eastward, connecting to Fredericksburg and Interstate 95. SR 229 provides a connection northward towards Rixeyville and U.S. Route 211.

Amtrak operates a station in Culpeper, station code CLP. This station is served by the Cardinal, Northeast Regional and Crescent trains daily. Nearly 9,000 train passengers in 2010 used Culpeper station, which connects to New Orleans, Chicago, Cincinnati, New York and Boston via the Crescent, Cardinal, and Northeast Regional lines.

The town of Culpeper is also serviced by Virginia Regional Transit. Virginia Regional Transit operates three buses in town—one on a northern loop, one on a southern loop, and one for disabled individuals.

Academy Bus offers a commuter bus from Culpeper to Washington, D.C.

Culpeper Regional Airport serves the area with a 5,000 foot runway.

Public schools 
 A.G. Richardson Elementary (18370 Simms Dr., Culpeper Va. 22701)
 Emerald Hill Elementary (11245 Rixeyville Road, Culpeper VA 22701)
 Farmington Elementary (500 Sunset Lane, Culpeper VA 22701)
 Pearl Sample Elementary (18480 Simms Drive, Culpeper VA 22701)
 Sycamore Park Elementary (451 Radio Lane, Culpeper, Virginia 22701)
 Yowell Elementary (701 Yowell Drive, Culpeper, VA 22701)
 Culpeper Middle School (14300 Achievement Drive, Culpeper VA 22701)
 Floyd T. Binns Middle School (205 E. Grandview Ave. Culpeper, VA 22701)
 Culpeper County High School (14240 Achievement Drive, Culpeper Va. 22701)
 Eastern View High School (16332 Cyclone Way, Culpeper, VA 22701)

Notable people 
 Nell Arthur, 21st First Lady of the United States
 Kenny Alphin, of the country music group Big & Rich
 John S. Barbour, Jr., U.S. congressman (1881–1887) and U.S. senator (1889-1892)
 Robert Young Button, Attorney General of Virginia (1962-1970) and Virginia State Senator (1945-1961)
 Cary Travers Grayson, highly decorated U.S. Navy surgeon, onetime chairman of the American Red Cross, and personal aide to U.S. President Woodrow Wilson
 A. P. Hill, Confederate general during the American Civil War, commander of "Hill's Light Division," under Stonewall Jackson
 John Preston "Pete" Hill, Negro league baseball player and member of the Baseball Hall of Fame, born in nearby Buena, Virginia
 John Jameson, Colonel in the American Revolutionary War
 Ann Jarvis, for whom Mother's Day was established by her daughter Anna Jarvis
 Keith Jennings, former NBA point guard, Golden State Warriors
 William Morgan, whose 1826 disappearance in New York state sparked a powerful anti-Freemasonry movement
 Waller T. Patton, Confederate colonel during the American Civil War, great-uncle of World War II General George S. Patton
 John Pendleton, American diplomat
 Eppa Rixey, major league pitcher and member of the Baseball Hall of Fame
 D. French Slaughter, Jr., former U.S. Congressman
 Jeannette Walls, author of The Glass Castle
 J. Loren Wince, lead singer/songwriter for the band Hurt

Notable events
 Culpeper was the location of the main encampment for the Army of the Potomac during the winter of 1863-64 during the Civil War. It was from Culpeper that General Ulysses S. Grant began the Overland Campaign against General Robert E. Lee's Army of Northern Virginia.
 During the presidential election campaign of 1960, vice presidential nominee Lyndon B. Johnson began his whistle-stop campaign of the South by giving a speech at Culpeper. As the train was pulling away from the station, Johnson yelled out a phrase that would become a battle cry of the campaign: "What did Dick Nixon ever do for Culpeper?!"
 In 1967, it was the site of a one-day standoff between members of the American Nazi Party and police and military personnel over the group's attempt to bury their leader George Lincoln Rockwell in the local National Cemetery.
 In 1995, former "Superman" actor Christopher Reeve lost his balance during a horse competition and fell, resulting in severe spinalinjury and paralysis. 
 Culpeper was featured in the nineteenth episode of the Small Town News Podcast, an improv comedy podcast that takes listeners on a fun and silly virtual trip to a small town in America each week. The hosts improvise scenes inspired by local newspaper stories.

References

External links

 Town of Culpeper official website
 Visitor Information
 Culpeper Regional Hospital 
 Culpeper Chamber of Commerce
 Culpeper County Public Schools

Towns in Culpeper County, Virginia
Micropolitan areas of Virginia
Towns in Virginia
County seats in Virginia
Populated places established in 1759
1759 establishments in Virginia